Faucher may refer to:

People with the surname
Calvin Faucher (born 1995), American baseball pitcher
Françoise Faucher (born 1929), Canadian actress
Léon Faucher (1803–1854), French politician and economist
Julius Faucher (1820–1878), German journalist
Narcisse Henri Édouard Faucher (1844–1897), Canadian writer, journalist, army officer and politician who published books under the name Faucher de Saint-Maurice
 Louis-Eugène Faucher, French general

Places
Faucher River, a tributary of Tessier Lake in La Tuque, Mauricie, Quebec, Canada
La Chapelle-Faucher, a commune in the Dordogne department in Aquitaine in southwestern France

French-language surnames